Luis Alberto Díez Ocerín (born 9 July 1992), commonly known as Tato, is a Spanish footballer who plays for Mons Calpe as a midfielder.

Football career
Born in Santander, Cantabria, Tato was a product of hometown club Racing de Santander's youth ranks. He made his senior debuts with the reserves in the 2009–10 campaign, aged only 17, in Segunda División B.

Tato made his first-team – and La Liga – debut on 6 March 2011, playing the last two minutes in a 1–3 home defeat against Real Madrid. He spent the vast majority of his spell registered with the B-side, however.

On 26 June 2013, Tato signed with Sestao River Club in Segunda División B. After featuring regularly for the Basques he moved to another reserve team, Sporting de Gijón B in the same level.

On 23 May 2016, Zira FK announced that Tato had left the club after one season in the Azerbaijan Premier League. On 23 September he returned to his home country, signing for UM Escobedo.

References

External links

1992 births
Living people
Spanish footballers
Footballers from Santander, Spain
Association football midfielders
La Liga players
Segunda División B players
Tercera División players
Rayo Cantabria players
Racing de Santander players
Sestao River footballers
Sporting de Gijón B players
Orihuela CF players
Azerbaijan Premier League players
Zira FK players
Mons Calpe S.C. players
Spanish expatriate footballers
Expatriate footballers in Azerbaijan
Spanish expatriate sportspeople in Azerbaijan